This is the results breakdown of the local elections held in the Balearic Islands on 26 May 2019. The following tables show detailed results in the autonomous community's most populous municipalities, sorted alphabetically.

Opinion polls

City control
The following table lists party control in the most populous municipalities, including provincial capitals (shown in bold). Gains for a party are displayed with the cell's background shaded in that party's colour.

Municipalities

Calvià
Population: 49,333

Ciutadella de Menorca
Population: 29,223

Ibiza
Population: 49,727

Inca
Population: 32,137

Llucmajor
Population: 36,358

Manacor
Population: 42,631

Maó-Mahón
Population: 28,592

Marratxí
Population: 36,725

Palma
Population: 409,661

Sant Antoni de Portmany
Population: 25,779

Sant Josep de sa Talaia
Population: 26,496

Santa Eulària des Riu
Population: 36,457

Island Councils

See also
2019 Balearic regional election

References

Balearic Islands
2019